The 13th Artistic Gymnastics World Championships were held in Rome, the capital of Italy, on June 28 - July 1, 1954. It was the first World Championships at which the Soviet Union competed, winning 20 medals overall (more than three times the amount of any other country).  Other major changes at this championships included:  1) it was the first world championships at which a Code of Points was used; and 2) it was the last world championships that would be held "in open air" (outdoors).

Medallists

Men's results

Team competition

Individual all-around

Floor exercise

Pommel horse

Rings

Vault

Parallel bars

Horizontal bar

Women's results

Team competition

Individual all-around

Vault

Uneven bars

Balance beam

Floor exercise

Medals

References

Romanian Gymnastics Federation: 1954 Results
Gymn Forum: World Championships Results
Gymnastics

World Artistic Gymnastics Championships
1954 in Italian sport
1954 in gymnastics
International gymnastics competitions hosted by Italy